Drew Blythe Barrymore (born February 22, 1975) is an American actress, director, producer, talk show host and author. A member of the Barrymore family of actors, she has received several awards and nominations, including a Golden Globe Award and a Screen Actors Guild Award, in addition to nominations for a British Academy Film Award and seven Emmy Awards. She received a star on the Hollywood Walk of Fame in 2004. 

Barrymore achieved fame as a child actor with her breakout role in E.T. the Extra-Terrestrial. Following a highly publicized childhood marked by drug and alcohol abuse, she released an autobiography Little Girl Lost. She starred in a string of successful films during the 1990s and 2000s, including Charlie's Angels, Never Been Kissed, Poison Ivy, Boys on the Side, Mad Love, Batman Forever, Scream and Ever After. Barrymore starred with Adam Sandler in three films The Wedding Singer, 50 First Dates and Blended. Her other films include Firestarter, Donnie Darko, Riding in Cars with Boys, Confessions of a Dangerous Mind, Charlie's Angels: Full Throttle, Fever Pitch, Music and Lyrics, Going the Distance, Big Miracle, and Miss You Already. She also starred in her directorial debut film Whip It. She won a Screen Actors Guild Award and a Golden Globe Award for her role in Grey Gardens. She starred in the Netflix series Santa Clarita Diet and currently hosts her syndicated talk show The Drew Barrymore Show.

Barrymore is the founder of the production company Flower Films. It produced several projects in which she has starred. She launched a range of cosmetics under the Flower banner in 2013, which has grown to include lines in make-up, perfume and eyewear. Her other business ventures include a range of wines and a clothing line. E. P. Dutton published a collection of Barrymore's autobiographical essays in a book titled Wildflower in 2015.

Early life

Ancestry

Drew Blythe Barrymore was born on February 22, 1975, in Culver City, California, to actor John Drew Barrymore and aspiring actress Jaid Barrymore (born Ildikó Jaid Makó), who was born in a displaced persons camp in Brannenburg, West Germany, to Hungarian World War II refugees. Through her father, Barrymore has three older half-siblings, including actor John Blyth Barrymore. Her parents divorced in 1984, when she was nine.

Barrymore was born into an acting family. All of her paternal great-grandparents, Maurice and Georgie Drew Barrymore, Maurice and Mae Costello ( Altschuk), and her paternal grandparents, John Barrymore and Dolores Costello, were actors, with John being arguably the most acclaimed actor of his generation. Barrymore is a niece of Diana Barrymore, a grandniece of Lionel Barrymore, Ethel Barrymore and Helene Costello, and a great-great-granddaughter of Irish-born John and English-born Louisa Lane Drew, all of whom were also actors. She is a great-grandniece of Broadway idol John Drew, Jr., and silent film actor, writer and director Sidney Drew.

Barrymore's godmothers are actress Sophia Loren and Lee Strasberg's widow, Anna Strasberg; Barrymore described her relationship with the latter as one that "would become so important to me as a kid because she was so kind and nurturing." Her godfather is filmmaker Steven Spielberg.

Barrymore's first name, Drew, was the maiden name of her paternal great-grandmother Georgie Drew, and her middle name, Blythe, was the surname of the family first used by her great-grandfather Maurice Barrymore. In her 1991 autobiography Little Girl Lost, Barrymore recounted early memories of her abusive father, who left the family when she was six months old. She and her father never had anything resembling a significant relationship and seldom spoke to each other.

Childhood
Barrymore grew up on Poinsettia Place in West Hollywood, until she moved to Sherman Oaks at the age of seven. In her 2015 memoir, Wildflower, she says she talks "like a valley girl" because she grew up in Sherman Oaks. She moved back to West Hollywood upon becoming emancipated at age fourteen. Barrymore attended elementary school at Fountain Day School in West Hollywood and Country School. In the wake of her sudden stardom, Barrymore endured a notoriously troubled childhood. She was a regular at Studio 54 as a young girl, and her nightlife and constant partying became a popular subject with the media. She was placed in rehab at the age of 13, and spent eighteen months in an institution for the mentally ill. A suicide attempt at 14 put her back in rehab, followed by a three-month stay with singer David Crosby and his wife. The stay was precipitated, Crosby said, because she "needed to be around some people that were committed to sobriety." Barrymore described this period of her life for Little Girl Lost. After a successful juvenile court petition for emancipation, she moved into her own apartment at the age of fifteen.

Career

1980s

Her career began at eleven months, when she appeared in a dog-food commercial. After her film debut with a small role in Altered States, she played Gertie in E.T. the Extra-Terrestrial. Spielberg felt that she had the right imagination for her role after she impressed him with a story that she led a punk rock band. E.T. was the highest-grossing film of the 1980s and made her one of the most famous child actors of the time. Barrymore won the Youth in Film Award for Best Young Supporting Actress. In the eighth season of Saturday Night Live, Barrymore became the youngest person to appear as a guest-host of the series.

In the 1984 horror film adaptation for Stephen King's 1980 novel Firestarter, Barrymore played a girl with pyrokinesis who becomes the target of a secret government agency known as The Shop. That same year, she played a young girl divorcing her famous parents in Irreconcilable Differences, and she was nominated for her first Golden Globe Award for Best Supporting Actress. In a review in the Chicago Sun-Times, Roger Ebert stated, "Barrymore is the right actress for this role precisely because she approaches it with such grave calm."

Barrymore endured a troubled youth and continued acting during the decade. She starred in the anthology horror film Cat's Eye, also written by King. The film received positive reviews and Barrymore was nominated for a Young Artist Award for Best Leading Young Actress. She was offered a role of Cecile for Dangerous Liaisons, but it went to Uma Thurman. Barrymore starred in the romance film See You in the Morning. Vincent Canby of The New York Times criticized the "fashionable phoniness" of the film, but positively singled it out for Barrymore. In Far from Home, she played a teenager who gets stranded with her father in the small town in a remote part of the desert. The film went largely unnoticed by audiences and received negative reviews from critics, who dismissed the sexual portrayal of her role.

1990s
Barrymore's rebelliousness played itself out on screen and in print. She forged an image as a manipulative teenage seductress, beginning with Poison Ivy, which was a box office failure, but was popular on video and cable. Her character "Ivy" was ranked at #6 on the list of the top 26 "bad girls" of all time by Entertainment Weekly. Barrymore was seventeen when she posed nude with her then-fiancé, actor Jamie Walters, for the cover of the July issue of Interview magazine; she also appeared nude in pictures inside the issue.

In Guncrazy, Barrymore played a teenager who kills her abusive stepfather. Variety remarked that she "pulls off impressively" her character, and Barrymore was nominated for the Golden Globe Award for Best Actress in a Miniseries or Television Film. Barrymore played the younger sister of a murdered ballerina in No Place to Hide and a writer followed by what is apparently her evil twin in Doppelganger. Both films were panned by critics and failed to find an audience. She appeared in the western film Bad Girls, which follows four former prostitutes on the run following a justifiable homicide and prison escape. Roger Ebert, in his review for the film, wrote for Chicago Sun-Times: "What a good idea, to make a Western about four tough women. And what a sad movie."

Barrymore posed nude for the January 1995 issue of Playboy. Director Steven Spielberg, who is also her godfather, gave her a quilt for her 20th birthday with a note that read, "Cover yourself up." Enclosed were copies of her Playboy pictures; the pictures had been altered by his art department so that she appeared fully clothed.

While appearing on the Late Show with David Letterman, Barrymore climbed onto the desk, flashed her breasts to David Letterman and gave him a kiss on the cheek as a birthday present. She modeled in a series of Guess? jeans ads during this time.

In Boys on the Side, Barrymore played a pregnant girl who attempts to escape from her abusive boyfriend. The film went little-seen in theaters but was positively received by critics. In the superhero film Batman Forever, she played one of the two female assistants for Two-Face (Tommy Lee Jones). Barrymore made a brief but notable appearance in Wes Craven's slasher film Scream. She read the film's script and was interested in being involved, approaching the production team herself to request a role. The producers were quick to take advantage of her unexpected interest and signed her to play the lead role of Sidney Prescott. However, after unexpected commitments, Barrymore played Casey Becker in a minor role, and Neve Campbell took the leading role. Scream was released to critical acclaim and made $173 million worldwide. During the 1990s, Barrymore re-established her image and continued to be a highly bankable star.

In The Wedding Singer, Barrymore played a waitress in love with the titular character, played by Adam Sandler. Variety found the film to be a "spirited, funny and warm saga" that serves them up "in a new way that enhances their most winning qualities". Budgeted at $18 million, the film grossed $123.3 million internationally. In Home Fries, Barrymore played a pregnant woman unknowingly falling for the stepson of the late father of her baby. She starred in the historical drama film Ever After, which made $98 million and was inspired by the fairy tale Cinderella. Roger Ebert said about Barrymore and the film: "she can hold the screen and involve us in her characters".

Barrymore voiced an anthropomorphic Jack Russell terrier in the Christmas television film Olive, the Other Reindeer and was nominated for a Primetime Emmy Award. After establishing Flower Films, Barrymore and Nancy Juvonen produced the company's first film, Never Been Kissed, in which Barrymore played an insecure copy editor for the Chicago Sun-Times and a high school student. While reviews from critics were mixed, CNN noted: "There are two words which describe why this film works: Drew Barrymore. Her comedic timing and willingness to go all out in her quest for a laugh combine to make Never Been Kissed a gratifying movie-going experience". The film was a commercial success, grossing $84.5 million.

2000s

In Charlie's Angels, Barrymore, Cameron Diaz and Lucy Liu played the trio of investigators in Los Angeles. The film was a major box office success and helped solidify the standing between Barrymore and the company. Barrymore starred in Riding in Cars with Boys, as a teenage mother in a failed marriage with the drug-addicted father (based on Beverly Donofrio's real-life story). When the production of Donnie Darko was threatened, Barrymore stepped forward with financing from the company, and played the title character's English teacher. Although the film was less than successful at the box office in the wake of 9/11, it reached cult status after the DVD release, inspiring numerous websites devoted to unraveling the plot twists and meanings.

Barrymore starred in George Clooney's directorial debut Confessions of a Dangerous Mind, based on the autobiography of television producer Chuck Barris. Barrymore reprised her role as Dylan Sanders in Charlie's Angels: Full Throttle, and starred with Ben Stiller in Duplex. Flower Films and Happy Madison Productions produced the film 50 First Dates, in which Barrymore played an amnesiac woman and Sandler played a marine veterinarian. Summing up Barrymore's appeal, Roger Ebert, in his review for the film, remarked that Barrymore displayed a "smiling, coy sincerity", in what he described as an "ingratiating and lovable" film. 50 First Dates was a commercial success; it made US$120.9 million in North America and US$196.4 million worldwide.

In the 2005 American remake adaptation of the 1997 British film Fever Pitch, Barrymore played the love interest of an immature school teacher (Jimmy Fallon). The film grossed a modest US$50 million worldwide and had generally favorable reviews by critics who felt it "has enough charm and on-screen chemistry between [Fallon and Barrymore] to make it a solid hit". She and Hugh Grant starred in Music and Lyrics, which focuses on the relationship that evolves between a former pop music idol and an aspiring writer as they struggle to compose a song for a reigning pop diva. The romantic comedy, released in February 2007, received largely positive reviews, with The Washington Post finding the two to be "great together" in it. The film was a commercial success, grossing US$145 million globally.

In Curtis Hanson's poker film Lucky You, Barrymore played an aspiring singer and the subject of the affections of a talented player. In Raja Gosnell's film Beverly Hills Chihuahua, Barrymore voiced the titular character, a richly pampered pet who gets dognapped in Mexico and has to escape from an evil Doberman.

Barrymore starred in the ensemble comedy He's Just Not That Into You, which received mixed reviews, partly due to her limited time on screen, while it grossed US$178 million worldwide. She played Edith Bouvier Beale, the daughter of Edith Ewing Bouvier Beale (Jessica Lange) in the HBO film Grey Gardens, which is based on the 1975 documentary film. The television film was a huge success, winning five Primetime Emmy Awards and two Golden Globe Awards. Rolling Stone writer Peter Travers found Barrymore to be a "revelation" in her role. Barrymore was nominated for the Emmy Award for Outstanding Lead Actress in a Miniseries or a Movie, and won the Golden Globe Award for Best Actress – Miniseries or Television Film and the Screen Actors Guild for Outstanding Performance by a Female Actor in a Television Movie or Miniseries.

Barrymore starred in her directorial debut film Whip It. It follows a high-schooler (Elliot Page) ditching the teen beauty pageant scene and participating in an Austin roller derby league. Barrymore worked with screenwriter Shauna Cross for months on script revisions, with Barrymore pushing her to "avoid her story's tidier prospects, to make things 'more raw and open ended.'" While the film found limited box office receipts, it was favorably received; according to review aggregation website Rotten Tomatoes, critics agreed that her "directorial debut has enough charm, energy, and good-natured humor to transcend its many cliches". For her venture, Barrymore garnered nominations for a Bronze Horse at the Stockholm Film Festival and for the EDA Female Focus Award at the 2009 Alliance of Women Film Journalists. In Everybody's Fine, Barrymore played the daughter of a recently widowed retiree (Robert De Niro). The drama flopped at the box office, but Stephen Holden for The New York Times considered Barrymore "as ingenuous as ever" in what he described as a "small role".

2010s

Barrymore starred with Justin Long in Nanette Burstein's film Going the Distance. It follows a couple dealing the ups and downs of a long-distance relationship, while commuting between New York City and San Francisco. It garnered generally mixed reviews by critics, who summed it as "timelier and a little more honest than most romantic comedies", and budgeted at US$32 million, the film made US$40 million at the worldwide box office.

On August 2, 2011, Barrymore directed the music video for the song "Our Deal," for the band Best Coast, which features Chloë Grace Moretz, Miranda Cosgrove, Tyler Posey, Donald Glover, Shailene Woodley and Alia Shawkat. Barrymore starred in the biopic film Big Miracle, which covers Operation Breakthrough, the 1988 international effort to rescue gray whales from being trapped in ice near Point Barrow, Alaska. Her character, Rachel Kramer, is based on Greenpeace activist Cindy Lowry. Despite a positive critical reception, the film flopped at the box office.

In Blended, Barrymore played a recently divorced woman ending up on a family resort with a widower (Sandler). Film critic James Berardinelli dismissed the "hit-and-miss humor" of the story and wrote that "as [Sandler and Barrymore] are concerned, the third time is definitely not the charm", as part of an overall lukewarm critical response. The film ultimately grossed US$128 million worldwide. She and Toni Collette starred in Miss You Already (2015), as two long-time friends whose relationship is put to the test when one starts a family and the other becomes ill. Reviewers embraced the film, while it received a limited theatrical release.

In the Netflix original television series Santa Clarita Diet, Barrymore played a real estate agent who, after experiencing a physical transformation into a zombie, starts craving human flesh. Along with co-star Timothy Olyphant, Barrymore served as an executive producer on the single-camera series, which was favorably received upon its premiere; Rolling Stone felt that "much of [the series' laughs] comes down to the uncrushable Drew Barrymore charm" and furthermore remarked: "The show is a welcome comeback for Barrymore, the eternally beloved grunge-era wild thing—it's not just her big move into TV, but her first high-profile performance anywhere in years. In a way, it circles back to the roles she was doing in the early [90s], playing deadly vixens in flicks like Guncrazy or Doppelganger".

2020s
Barrymore starred in Jamie Babbit's film The Stand In. It was set to premiere at the Tribeca Film Festival in April 2020, but was cancelled due to the COVID-19 pandemic. On September 14, 2020, Barrymore launched a syndicated daytime talk show, The Drew Barrymore Show. On December 4, 2020, she appeared as a guest star on Martha Knows Best.  On March 11, 2021, Barrymore said she was taking an indefinite hiatus from acting. She wrote a cookbook with chef Pilar Valdes titled Rebel Homemaker. In June 2021, she launched Drew Magazine, a quarterly released lifestyle magazine by publisher Bauer Media USA.

Image and fashion

Barrymore became a CoverGirl Cosmetics' model and spokeswoman in 2007. In February 2015, she became one of the faces of CoverGirl, alongside Queen Latifah and Taylor Swift. The company partnered with her because "she emulates the iconic image of CoverGirl with her fresh, natural beauty and energetic yet authentic spirit," said Esi Eggleston Bracey, vice president and general manager of CoverGirl Cosmetics North America. She brought not only her personality into this endorsement but also her creative side, as she also helped create the ads. She was No. 1 in People's annual 100 Most Beautiful People list in 2007. She was named the new face for the Gucci jewelry line. As a model, Barrymore signed a contract with IMG Models New York City. She also was a spokeswoman for Crocs.

In May 2007, Barrymore was named Ambassador Against Hunger for the United Nations World Food Programme and later donated $1 million to the cause. As a guest photographer for a magazine series called "They Shoot New York", she appeared on the cover holding a Pentax K1000 film camera. She expressed hopes of exposing her work in a gallery one day, as she had documented the most recent decade of her life with a Pentax camera.

Barrymore launched a women's fashion line in fall 2017 in conjunction with Amazon.com called Dear Drew, which featured a pop-up shop in New York City that opened in November.

Personal life

In 1991, Barrymore was engaged to Leland Hayward's grandson, Leland III. The engagement was called off a few months later.  She was engaged to Jamie Walters from 1992 to 1993.

Barrymore married Welsh-born Los Angeles bar owner Jeremy Thomas on March 20, 1994. She filed for divorce from him less than two months later. 

In late 1994, Barrymore began dating Hole guitarist Eric Erlandson, followed by MTV host and comedian Tom Green in 1999; she and Green were engaged in July 2000 and married a year later. Together, they starred in Charlie's Angels and Green's directorial film debut, Freddy Got Fingered. Green filed for divorce in December 2001, which was finalized on October 15, 2002.

In 2002, Barrymore began dating The Strokes drummer Fabrizio Moretti shortly after they met at a concert. Their relationship ended in January 2007. She began dating Justin Long, but they broke up in July 2008. Barrymore and Long later presented themselves as a couple while filming Going the Distance, before breaking up again the following year.

In early 2011, Barrymore began dating art consultant Will Kopelman, the son of former Chanel COO Arie L. Kopelman. The couple announced their engagement in January 2012, and married on June 2, 2012, in Montecito, California. Four days later, the couple's wedding image appeared on the cover of People magazine. They have two daughters: Olive (born 2012) and Frankie (born 2014). On April 2, 2016, Barrymore and Kopelman released a statement about their separation. On July 15, 2016, Barrymore officially filed for divorce, which was finalized on August 3, 2016.

In an interview with Contactmusic.com in 2003, Barrymore said: “Do I like women sexually? Yeah, I do. Totally. I have always considered myself bisexual. I love a woman's body. I think a woman and a woman together are beautiful, just as a man and a woman together are beautiful. Being with a woman is like exploring your own body, but through someone else".

Barrymore is the godmother of Frances Bean Cobain, the daughter of Kurt Cobain and Courtney Love.

Barrymore eats a plant-based diet. She reportedly convinced Cardi B to try veganism.

Awards, honors, and nominations

In 1999, Barrymore was honored by the Young Artist Foundation with its Former Child Star "Lifetime Achievement" Award commemorating her outstanding achievements within the film industry as a child actress. For her contributions to the film industry, Barrymore received a motion pictures star on the Hollywood Walk of Fame in 2004. Her star is located at 6925 Hollywood Boulevard.

Her films compiled a worldwide box office gross that stood at over US$2.3 billion. According to The Hollywood Reporters annual Star Salary Top 10, she was tied for eighth place on the top ten list of actresses' salaries, commanding 10 to 12 million dollars per film for 2006. Barrymore became the youngest person to have hosted Saturday Night Live having hosted on November 20, 1982, at 7 years of age, a record that still remains unbroken . On February 3, 2007, Barrymore hosted SNL for the fifth time, becoming the second female host (after Candice Bergen) in the show's history to do so. She hosted again on October 10, 2009, becoming the first female to host six times.

See also
 List of celebrities who own wineries and vineyards

References

Further reading
 Aronson, Virginia. Drew Barrymore. Chelsea House, 1999. 
 Bankston, John. Drew Barrymore. Chelsea House Publishers, 2002. 
 Barrymore, Drew. Little Girl Lost. Pocket Star Books, 1990. 
 Dye, David. Child and Youth Actors: Filmography of Their Entire Careers, 1914–1985. Jefferson, NC: McFarland & Co., 1988, p. 11.
 Ellis, Lucy. Drew Barrymore: The Biography. Aurum Press, 2004. 
 Hill, Anne E. Drew Barrymore. Lucent Books, 2001.

External links

 
 
 
 

 
1975 births
Living people
20th-century American actresses
21st-century American actresses
21st-century American businesspeople
21st-century American businesswomen
Actresses from Los Angeles County, California
Ambassadors of supra-national bodies
Ambassadors of the United States
American autobiographers
American child actresses
American female models
American film actresses
American film producers
American people of English descent
American people of German descent
American people of Hungarian descent
American people of Irish descent
American television actresses
American television talk show hosts
American voice actresses
American women ambassadors
American women company founders
American company founders
American women film directors
American women film producers
American women non-fiction writers
American women television personalities
American women television presenters
American women television producers
Artists from California
Audiobook narrators
Drew Barrymore
Best Miniseries or Television Movie Actress Golden Globe winners
Bisexual actresses
Bisexual memoirists   
Businesspeople from California
Female models from California
Film directors from California
Film producers from California
American LGBT artists
American LGBT broadcasters
American LGBT businesspeople
American bisexual actors
LGBT film directors
LGBT models
LGBT people from California
LGBT film producers
LGBT television producers
Outstanding Performance by a Female Actor in a Miniseries or Television Movie Screen Actors Guild Award winners
People from Culver City, California
People from West Hollywood, California
Television producers from California
World Food Programme people
Women autobiographers
Writers from California